Dennis Casper Janebrink (born 2 January 1970) is a Swedish singer, songwriter and musician. He is the lead vocalist and primary lyricist of dansband Arvingarna.

Casper Janebrink is the son of Dennis Janebrink and Ing-Marie. He grew up in Partille.

In 1993, the Arvingarna song "Eloise" won Melodifestivalen. With Arvingarna, he has participated at Melodifestivalen five times.

In 2011, he participated in Körslaget with a choir from his home municipality of Partille. In 2018 he won Stjärnornas stjärna, which aired over TV4. He presented Bingolotto on 7 February 2016.

Citations

External links 

 
 

1970 births
Living people
20th-century Swedish male singers
21st-century Swedish male singers
Swedish male singer-songwriters
Swedish multi-instrumentalists
Musicians from Gothenburg
Eurovision Song Contest entrants of 1993
Eurovision Song Contest entrants for Sweden
Melodifestivalen contestants of 2021
Melodifestivalen contestants of 2019
Melodifestivalen contestants of 2002
Melodifestivalen contestants of 1999
Melodifestivalen contestants of 1995
Melodifestivalen contestants of 1993